Izatullo Khayoyevich Khayoyev (Izzatullo Hayoyev; , 22 June 1936 – 25 April 2015) was the first Vice President of Tajikistan from December 1990 to 25 June 1991 and the first Prime Minister of Tajikistan from 25 June 1991 to 9 January 1992. Previously he served as Chairmen of the Council of Ministers of the Tajik SSR from 1986 to 1990.

Death
He died on 25 April 2015, aged 78, likely due to experienced with health problems few years earlier. President Emomali Rahmon expressed condolences to his friends and family members.

References

1936 births
2015 deaths
People from Khatlon Region
Central Committee of the Communist Party of the Soviet Union members
Members of the Congress of People's Deputies of the Soviet Union
Eleventh convocation members of the Supreme Soviet of the Soviet Union
Heads of government of the Tajik Soviet Socialist Republic
Prime Ministers of Tajikistan
Vice presidents of Tajikistan

Recipients of the Order of the Red Banner of Labour